The South Funen Archipelago is the popular name for the part of the Baltic Sea south of the ports of Faaborg and Svendborg on the Danish island of Funen. The depth of the sea is typically between 20 and 30 meters. The archipelago includes some 55 low-lying Danish islands, including Ærø, Tåsinge, Thurø, Lyø, Strynø and Avernakø.

See also
 List of islands of Denmark
 Sydhavsøerne
 Danish Wadden Sea Islands

References

External links

Baltic Sea
Archipelagoes of the Baltic Sea
Archipelagoes of Denmark